En Concierto may refer to:
 En Concierto (1983 Timbiriche album)
 En Concierto (1999 Timbiriche album)
 En Concierto (Ska-P album)
 En concierto (Julio Iglesias album), 1983